Kyōsai is a crater on Mercury.  Its name was adopted by the International Astronomical Union (IAU) in 2012. It is named for the Japanese artist Kawanabe Kyōsai.

Hollows are present on the floor of Kyōsai.

References

Impact craters on Mercury